The national anthem of Yugoslavia may refer to:

The "National Anthem of the Kingdom of Yugoslavia", in use from 1919 to 1941
"Hey, Slavs", in use by the Socialist Federal Republic of Yugoslavia from 1943 to 1991 and by the Federal Republic of Yugoslavia from 1992 to 2003

See also
 Flag of Yugoslavia
 Coat of arms of Yugoslavia